Hestnes is a small village in Eigersund municipality in Rogaland county, Norway. The village is on the southern edge of the town of Egersund. The population of Hestnes in 2007 was 203, but since that time it has been considered part of the Egersund urban area.

References

Villages in Rogaland
Eigersund